This is a list of airlines currently operating in United States Virgin Islands.

See also
 Lists of airlines
 List of defunct airlines of the United States Virgin Islands

United States Virgin Islands
Virgin Islands
United States Virgin Islands
Airlines